The Center–Gaillard House is a historic residence in Mobile, Alabama.  The earliest part of the house was built in 1827.  It was placed on the National Register of Historic Places on October 18, 1984, as a part of the 19th Century Spring Hill Neighborhood Thematic Resource.

References

National Register of Historic Places in Mobile, Alabama
Houses on the National Register of Historic Places in Alabama
Houses in Mobile, Alabama
Houses completed in 1827
1827 establishments in Alabama